In economics, the term pork cycle, hog cycle, or cattle cycle describes the phenomenon of cyclical fluctuations of supply and prices in livestock markets. It was first observed in 1925 in pig markets in the US by Mordecai Ezekiel and in Europe in 1927 by the German scholar .

Explanations of cycles in livestock markets

The cobweb model

Nicholas Kaldor proposed a model of fluctuations in agricultural markets called the cobweb model, based on production lags and adaptive expectations. In his model, when prices are high, more investments are made. However, the effect of these investments is delayed due to the breeding time - the production lag. Eventually, the market becomes saturated, leading to a decline in prices. Production is thus decreased and again, this takes time to be noticed, leading to increased demand and again increased prices. The cycle continues to repeat, producing a supply-demand graph resembling a cobweb.

The model has also been applied in certain labour sectors: high salaries in a particular sector lead to an increased number of students studying the relevant subject; when these students enter the job market at the same time after several years of studying, their job prospects and salaries are much worse due to the new surplus of applicants. This in turn deters students from studying this subject, producing a deficiency and higher wages once again.

An alternative model
Kaldor's model involves an assumption that investors make systematic mistakes. In his model, investing (i.e. breeding cattle rather than slaughtering them) when prices are high causes future prices to fall - foreseeing this (i.e. slaughtering more when prices are high) can yield higher profits for the investors. Sherwin Rosen, Kevin M. Murphy, and José Scheinkman (1994) proposed an alternative model in which cattle ranchers have perfectly rational expectations about future prices. They showed that even in this case, the three-year lifetime of beef cattle would cause rational ranchers to choose breeding versus slaughtering in a way that would cause cattle populations to fluctuate over time.

See also
Feedback
Hog/corn ratio
Kitchin cycle
Oscillation

References

Further reading

Market (economics)
Agricultural economics
Business cycle theories